John I Sanudo (or Giovanni; died 1362) was the sixth Duke of the Archipelago from 1341 to his death.

He was the brother and successor of Nicholas I and son of William I. His other brother was Marco Sanudo, Lord of Milos.

In 1344, the Ottoman Turks occupied part of Naxos, enslaving 6,000 locals. John was a supporter of Venice in her war against Genoa, but he was captured and taken captive to Genoa in 1354. He was let go in by the terms of the peace treaty of 1355.

With his wife Maria he had one daughter, Florence, who succeeded him.

Sources

References

 Ancestry of Sultana Nur-Banu (Cecilia Venier-Baffo)

Year of birth missing
1362 deaths
John 01
John 01
14th-century Venetian people